Constellation busway station is a bus station on Auckland's Northern Busway in New Zealand. It is located near Constellation Drive in the light industrial and business area of Rosedale. It has shelters, electronic real-time information on each platform, and park and ride parking.

The next station southbound is Sunnynook busway station. The next northbound is Albany busway station.

Buses travelling via Constellation Station include double-decker buses serving the Northern Express NX1 and NX2 routes.

History 
Construction of Constellation Park and Ride station began in March 2003 as part of the Northern Busway project. The station successfully opened in November 2005. HEB was the construction contractor for the station.

Capacity issues 
Following the implementation of the new bus network on 30 September 2018 there were significant issues with bus traffic through the station. On the evening of 1 October there were, reportedly, more than thirteen buses backed up while trying to enter the station. Commuters reported spending as long as twenty minutes waiting while stuck in gridlock. The new network had apparently resulted in three buses arriving every minute during the afternoon peak. Auckland Transport resolved this issue by suspending 37 of 180 runs on the NX1 route, as well as re-organising buses in the layover area to free up space, and implementing temporary traffic management to direct bus drivers to the correct stop.

North Shore Councillor, Chris Darby, said that the issues appeared to have been caused by new drivers not being familiar with the correct platforms to stop at, as well as an imposter vehicle on the bus way. He said that the new network had seen a 44 percent increase in bus services and "there was always going to be a risk of hiccups."

In the longer term, AT have responded by diverting some services to different platforms during the afternoon peak.

Structure and facilities 
At opening, the station covered an area of 25,000m2 with two points of entry at Sunset Road and Parkway Drive. The Park and Ride Facility had 370 car parks.

The station previously had lockers for bicycle storage. These were upgraded to bicycle parking facilities with shelters.

Services
As of 30 September 2018, the following bus routes serve Constellation station: NX1, NX2, 866, 83, 843, 871, 878, 883, 884, 885, 889, 95C, 120, 861, 901, 906, 907.

Some Stop D services move stops between 3pm and 8pm.

General hours

Stop changes between 3pm and 8pm

Upgrades 

Constellation station is currently undergoing upgrades to accommodate the extension of the Northern Busway as part of the Northern Corridor Improvements. The project is estimated to cost $15 million. It includes a new northbound platform for buses heading north onto the extended busway. It also includes a pedestrian bridge over the busway to connect the new northbound platform to the existing southbound platform, similar to the layout at Smales Farm Station. The 28 metre long transparent glass pedestrian bridge was lifted into place over Labour Weekend of 2020. Additional improvements include new toilets, lifts, driver facilities, and a kiosk area.

Incidents 
On 22 April 2021, there was a two-bus collision at the station after a NX2 service pulled out into the path of another bus.

Future 

There have been proposals for apartments to be built above the parking area.

To deal with park and ride congestion, there have been proposals for the implementation of fees for parking.

References

External links
 Auckland Transport The Auckland Council Controlled Organisation that owns the station and oversees the operation of AT Metro bus services
 New Zealand Transport Agency – Waka Kotahi 
 Northern Corridor Improvements Project Page

Northern Busway, Auckland
Bus stations in New Zealand
Transport buildings and structures in the Auckland Region